George Washington is a large bronze sculpture of George Washington by John Quincy Adams Ward, installed on the front steps of Federal Hall National Memorial on Wall Street in New York City.

History
The statue was unveiled in 1883 to commemorate the first inauguration of George Washington. In 1789, Federal Hall, which served as the capitol building of the United States, stood on the site, and Washington took the oath of office on the balcony of that building, approximately where the statue now stands.

Description

Inscription
The inscription on the base of the statue reads:

See also

 1883 in art
 List of monuments dedicated to George Washington
 List of sculptures of presidents of the United States
 List of statues of George Washington

References

1883 establishments in New York (state)
1883 sculptures
Bronze sculptures in New York City
Financial District, Manhattan
Monuments and memorials in Manhattan
Monuments and memorials to George Washington in the United States
Outdoor sculptures in Manhattan
Sculptures by John Quincy Adams Ward
Sculptures of men in New York City
Statues in New York City
Statues of George Washington